José de Toro was Mayor of Ponce, Puerto Rico, in two occasions: 1814 and in 1820 (starting on 3 June 1820). In 1814, he performed as a teniente a guerra mayor, while from 3 June 1820 until later that year he performed as Alcalde ordinario.

First mayoral term (1814)
In 1814, while José de Toro was mayor of Ponce and his secretary was Jose Inchausty, a cemetery was built at the (then) end of Calle Unión. At the time calle Union had no houses and the lands were part of Hacienda Molina. The cemetery, which no longer exists, was active for 28 years - until 1842 - when it was replaced by the cemetery at Panteón Nacional Román Baldorioty de Castro.

Second mayoral term (1820)
In 1820, the first known division of the Ponce territory into barrios takes place.

Legacy
There is a street in Urbanización Las Delicias of Barrio Magueyes in Ponce named after him.

See also

 List of Puerto Ricans
 List of mayors of Ponce, Puerto Rico

Notes

References

1760s births
1840s deaths
Year of birth uncertain
Year of death uncertain
Mayors of Ponce, Puerto Rico